The Sororó River is a river in the state of Pará, Brazil. It is a left tributary of the Itacaiúnas River.

Tributaries of the Sororó River drain the Serra das Andorinhas within the  Serra dos Martírios/Andorinhas State Park, created in 1996.

See also
List of rivers of Pará

References

Rivers of Pará